Jasper White may refer to:

 Jasper White (chef) (born 1954), American chef, restaurateur and author
 Jasper White (photographer) (born 1973), British photographer